Herbert Hodge (1901-?) was a London taxi driver and BBC radio personality.

He appeared as a castaway on the BBC Radio programme Desert Island Discs on 16 July 1943.

Hodge's autobiography, It's Draughty In Front, was published in 1938. He stood for the New Party in Limehouse at the 1931 General Election.

Bibliography

References

External links 

 Herbert Hodge – The Cabbie Philosopher

1901 births
Year of death missing
BBC people